Óscar Luis Muñoz Oviedo (born 9 May 1993) is a Colombian taekwondo practitioner who won a bronze medal at the 2012 Summer Olympics in the -58 kg weight class. This was the fifth Olympic medal for Colombia at the 2012 Summer Olympics, and the first medal in this sport. At the 2016 Olympics he was eliminated in the first bout.

Muñoz took up taekwondo aged 12. In March 2016 he started working as a taekwondo coach.

References

1993 births
Living people
Colombian male taekwondo practitioners
Olympic taekwondo practitioners of Colombia
Taekwondo practitioners at the 2012 Summer Olympics
Taekwondo practitioners at the 2016 Summer Olympics
Olympic bronze medalists for Colombia
Olympic medalists in taekwondo
Medalists at the 2012 Summer Olympics
Sportspeople from Magdalena Department
21st-century Colombian people